Lee Mi-gyeong (born 26 May 1975) is a South Korean long-distance runner. She competed in the women's marathon at the 1996 Summer Olympics.

References

1975 births
Living people
Athletes (track and field) at the 1996 Summer Olympics
South Korean female long-distance runners
South Korean female marathon runners
Olympic athletes of South Korea
Place of birth missing (living people)
20th-century South Korean women